Burning Wind is a codename for signals intelligence (SIGINT) missions by the United States Air Force. The missions are undertaken by RC-135 Rivet Joint aircraft. Other missions undertaken by Rivet Joint aircraft may be designated Misty Wind.

Bases
The Rivet Joint aircraft fly or have flown Burning Wind missions from the following bases:
Eielson AFB, Alaska
Offutt AFB, Nebraska
Howard AB, Panama
RAF Mildenhall, England
Hellenikon AB, Greece
Kadena Air Base, Okinawa, Japan
RAF Upper Heyford, England

References

United States Air Force